The Marine Environmental Data and Information Network (MEDIN) is a United Kingdom organization created to curate marine environmental data. It is overseen by the UK government's Marine Science Co-ordination Committee.

References 

Oceanography
Scientific organisations based in the United Kingdom